Brillante "Dante" Mendoza (born July 30, 1960) is a Filipino independent filmmaker. Mendoza is known one of the key members associated with the Filipino New Wave.

Career 
He was born and raised in San Fernando, Pampanga. He took advertising arts of the College of Architecture and Fine Arts at the University of Santo Tomas.

He has directed sixteen films since 2005, also he credited some cinematographer and production designer under his alias. His first frequent collaboration with actor Coco Martin in seven films including Masahista, Summer Heat, Foster Child, Tirador, Serbis, Kinatay, and Captive.

On July 25, 2016, he directed the first State of the Nation Address of President Rodrigo Duterte. Mendoza also directed Duterte's second State of the Nation Address on July 24, 2017.

Filmography

Recognition
He is the first Filipino filmmaker to receive the Best Director award for his film Kinatay at the 62nd Cannes Film Festival. His 2009 film Lola won the award for Best Film at the 6th Dubai International Film Festival.

His 2012 film Captive was shown in competition at the 62nd Berlin International Film Festival in February 2012. His 2012 film Thy Womb competed for the Golden Lion at the 69th Venice International Film Festival and earned Mendoza the award for Achievement in Directing at the Asia Pacific Screen Awards in 2012.

His film Taklub was selected to be screened in the Un Certain Regard section at the 2015 Cannes Film Festival.

Mendoza is one of the few people and is the only Filipino filmmaker to compete and nominated all three major prizes from "The Big Three" (Cannes, Berlin, Venice).

References

External links

1960 births
Living people
Filipino film directors
People from San Fernando, Pampanga
Artists from Pampanga
Cannes Film Festival Award for Best Director winners
Chevaliers of the Ordre des Arts et des Lettres
University of Santo Tomas alumni
Asia Pacific Screen Award winners